The men's discus throw was an event at the 1956 Summer Olympics in Melbourne, Australia. Twenty athletes from 15 nations competed. The maximum number of athletes per nation had been set at 3 since the 1930 Olympic Congress. The qualifying round and the final both were held on Tuesday November 27, 1956. The event was won by Al Oerter of the United States, the nation's second consecutive and ninth overall victory in the men's discus throw. It was the first of four straight gold medals for Oerter. The United States earned its second medal sweep in the event (after 1908), as Fortune Gordien took silver and Des Koch took bronze. Gordien became the fifth man to win two medals in the event, and the first to do so in non-consecutive Games (silver in 1948, fourth place in 1952). Italy's three-Games medal streak in the event ended.

Background

This was the 13th appearance of the event, which is one of 12 athletics events to have been held at every Summer Olympics. Returning finalists from the 1952 Games were silver medalist (and 1948 gold medalist) Adolfo Consolini of Italy, fourth-place finisher (and 1948 bronze medalist) Fortune Gordien of the United States, fifth-place finisher Ferenc Klics of Hungary, and sixth-place finisher Oto Grigalka and tenth-place finisher Boris Matveyev of the Soviet Union. Consolini, the two-time Olympic medalist and three-time European champion, was the "slight favorite".

However, the American team was also strong. Fortune Gordien came into the Olympics as the world record holder for most of the previous seven years. He had lost the record for a 3 week gap in 1953 to 1952 Olympic champion Sim Iness, before he made another improvement at a small Pasadena, California all comers track meet. Gordien threw the longest throw of the year while winning the United States Olympic Trials by almost three metres over a 20 year old upstart from the University of Kansas, Al Oerter. The third qualifier at those trials was Ron Drummond, but with almost five months to wait until the Olympics, he gave up his Olympic spot to go to dental school, allowing 4th place Des Koch the opportunity to go to Melbourne.

Fiji made its debut in the men's discus throw. The United States made its 13th appearance, having competed in every edition of the Olympic men's discus throw to date.

Summary

In the qualifying round, Oerter threw 51.19 metres to easily qualify ahead of Commonwealth Games champion Fanie du Plessis and returning silver medalist, 39 year old Adolfo Consolini. The format allowed all who cleared 47 metres to qualify to the finals, Gordien's 47.67 metres made the distance by a little over 2 feet, still he was the twelfth qualifier. The sixteenth and last qualifier into the final was Koch, just 14 cm, less than 6 inches over the minimum.

In the first round of the final, Oerter threw an Olympic record , Gordien 54.75m was second best while Mark Pharaoh held third a meter and a half ahead of Consolini. Those positions held into the third round. With only six going into the final, Koch was in 10th place, needing a big improvement to get into the final. Koch's 53.55m put him into third place. He improved on both his next two attempts to get to 54.40m. In the final round, Pharaoh improved to 54.27m but still 14 cm short of bronze, Gordien improved marginally to 54.81m and Oerter made his third throw of the competition superior to the silver medal throw.

This was the second American sweep of the discus throw (after 1908). Oerter would lead another sweep four years later and would go on to his own sweep, winning the same event four times in a row, an Olympic record.

Competition format

The competition used the two-round format introduced in 1936, with the qualifying round completely separate from the divided final. In qualifying, each athlete received three attempts; those recording a mark of at least 47.00 metres advanced to the final. If fewer than 12 athletes achieved that distance, the top 12 would advance. The results of the qualifying round were then ignored. Finalists received three throws each, with the top six competitors receiving an additional three attempts. The best distance among those six throws counted.

Records

Prior to the competition, the existing world and Olympic records were as follows.

Al Oerter set a new Olympic record with his first throw of the final, 56.36 metres. This would hold up as the new record and win the gold medal for him; his fourth throw (55.08 metres) also bettered the old record.

Schedule

All times are Australian Eastern Standard Time (UTC+10)

Results

Qualifying

Final

References

External links
 Official Report
 Results

M
Discus throw at the Olympics
Men's events at the 1956 Summer Olympics